Les Mauvais Coups (Naked Autumn) is a 1961 French psychological drama under the direction of François Leterrier. It tells the story of the tragic demise of a 10-year marriage.
The austere screenplay is based on a Roger Vailland novel. 

Though by no means a nouvelle vague style work, the opening credits over a dismal landscape with ominous music have a Chabrolesque touch. It was the first film directed by Leterrier, best known for his leading role in A Man Escaped, the 1956 movie by Robert Bresson.

Cast
Simone Signoret as Roberte
Reginald Kernan as Milan
Alexandra Stewart as Hélène
Marcello Pagliero as Luigi
Serge Rousseau as Duval
Nicole Chollet	
José Luis de Vilallonga as Prévieux
Dorian Leigh Parker		
Marie-Claude Poirier		
Marcelle Ranson-Hervé		
Antoine Roblot	
Serge Sauvion as The veterinarian

External links 
 

1961 films
Films based on French novels
Films directed by François Leterrier
French psychological drama films
1960s French-language films
1960s French films